Tanya Patrice Wright is an American entrepreneur, actress and author. Born and raised in South Bronx, NY, Tanya has always been drawn to a life in the arts. Her first creative award was given to her in 5th grade as "best writer," which she was given for her imaginative story about a Christmas tree. Tanya studied Comparative Literature at Vassar College, and after her graduation, she went on to be offered her first main-line acting gig: Tanya Simpson on The Cosby Show. She is best known for her starring on Buddies as Phyllis Brooks, as well as her recurring roles on 24 as Patty Brooks, NYPD Blue as Officer Maya Anderson, on True Blood as Deputy Kenya Jones, and as Crystal on the Netflix original series Orange Is the New Black.

Biography
Tanya Wright was born in the Spring of 1971 in The Bronx to a 15 year old mother,  Debra Fraser-Howze, who later became an AIDS activist. Her sister, Sheena Wright, is a nonprofit executive who is the first woman president of the United Way of New York City.

Tanya is an alumna of the Oliver Scholars Program and graduated high school from George School, a private Quaker school. She received a degree in Independent Studies/Comparative Literature at Vassar College. She studied at Harvard University in the Learning, Design, Innovation, and Technology (LDIT) program.

Career
Over the course of her career, Tanya made the decision to start wearing her hair naturally. Tanya wrote a book entitled Butterfly Rising, which was released on August 5, 2012. Tanya is also a screenwriter, having written the screenplay for her book, for which she will also be directing and producing.

Wright started a haircare line called HAIRiette in which some the proceeds go to The Actor's Fund.

She starred in the play The Little Birch Tree in elementary school which started her acting career. While attending Vassar, she audition and landed a role in The Cosby Show.

Awards

 Tanya is a two-time winner of the Screen Actor's Guild (SAG) Award, Best Acting Ensemble for her portrayal of Crystal Burset in Orange is the New Black.
 Tanya is the recipient of SOBRO's "Most innovative Business" Award for HAIRiette.

Filmography

Film

Television

References

External links
 
 

Living people
Actresses from New York City
American film actresses
American television actresses
American stage actresses
African-American actresses
African-American screenwriters
21st-century American novelists
American women novelists
Writers from the Bronx
African-American film directors
African-American film producers
Film producers from New York (state)
Screenwriters from New York (state)
Vassar College alumni
20th-century American actresses
21st-century American actresses
21st-century American women writers
Novelists from New York (state)
Film directors from New York City
American women film producers
George School alumni
21st-century American screenwriters
Entertainers from the Bronx
African-American novelists
20th-century African-American women
21st-century African-American women writers
21st-century African-American writers
Year of birth missing (living people)